CM Airlines is a domestic airline in Honduras. According to the airline "CM" stands for "Cielo Maya" (Mayan sky).

Destinations

Fleet
Saab 340 (4)
Embraer EMB 110 Bandeirante (7)
Let 410 (3)

References

CM Airlines

Airlines of Honduras